The 1948 Wake Forest Demon Deacons football team was an American football team that represented Wake Forest University during the 1948 college football season. In its 12th season under head coach Peahead Walker, the team compiled a 6–4 record, finished in fifth place in the Southern Conference, and lost to Baylor in the 1949 Dixie Bowl.

Back Bill Gregus and end John O'Quinn were selected by the Associated Press as first-team players on the 1948 All-Southern Conference football team.

Schedule

References

Wake Forest
Wake Forest Demon Deacons football seasons
Wake Forest Demon Deacons football